Frederick Hollyer (17 June 1838 – 21 November 1933) was an English photographer and engraver known for his photographic reproductions of paintings and drawings, particularly those of the Pre-Raphaelite Brotherhood, and for portraits of literary and artistic figures of late Victorian and Edwardian London.

Family

Hollyer was the youngest son of Samuel Hollyer (1797–1883), a line engraver, fine art publisher, collector of watercolours, and Deputy Sealer at the Court of Chancery until 1853, when the post was abolished. His brothers Christopher Charles Hollyer (1836–1874), and Samuel Hollyer Jr. (1826–1919) also worked as engravers. Frederick Hollyer's first published works were mezzotint engravings of two paintings by Edwin Landseer published by J. McQueen in 1869.

Photographic career
Hollyer became interested in photography about 1860. He made albumen and carbon prints, but his preferred medium was the platinotype or platinum print process, admired for its permanence and great tonal range. Under the patronage of Frederic Leighton, Hollyer began to photograph paintings and drawings in the 1870s. Artists whose work he published include Edward Burne-Jones, George Frederic Watts, Simeon Solomon, and Dante Gabriel Rossetti. Of his work with the Pre-Raphaelites, The Times noted that

Hollyer's photographs of drawings were particularly successful; printed on high-quality paper, they were often mistaken for originals.  One of the most popular was a study of three heads by Burne-Jones for The Masque of Cupid.

Hollyer also took studio portraits and specialised in interior and exterior photos of houses. For 30 years, he reserved Mondays for portrait photography in his Pembroke Square studio.  His sitters included the artists Walter Crane, William Morris, G. F. Watts, and Burne-Jones; the writers John Ruskin, H. G. Wells, and George Bernard Shaw; and the actresses Mrs Patrick Campbell and Ellen Terry. Hollyer eschewed the formal poses of most studio portraiture of his day; in an 1899 interview in The Photogram he said

Hollyer did much to establish photography as a fine art.  His work was widely acclaimed in his own day; in 1897, a critic in The Studio lamented:

Hollyer joined the Royal Photographic Society 1865 and became a Fellow in 1895, but was also involved in The Linked Ring, a society formed in to support pictorialism in opposition to the Photographic Society. He was a member of the Solar Club and became one of the Founder Members of the Professional Photographers' Association in 1901.

Later life

Frederick Hollyer married Mary Anne Armstrong (1838–1913).  Their eldest son Frederick Thomas Hollyer (1870–1952) worked with his father and took over the studio when the elder Hollyer retired in 1913. Frederick Hollyer died 21 November 1933 at his eldest son's home in Blewbury (then part of Berkshire), aged 95.

Today, Hollyer is remembered chiefly for his photographs of Burne-Jones, William Morris, and their circle.

Gallery

Notes

References
 
 
 Biography of Frederick Hollyer at Luminous-Lint. Accessed 2008-09-01.
 
 
 Harker, Margaret: The Linked Ring, The Secession Movement in Photography in Britain, 1892–1910, London, Heinmann, 1979
 Lochnan, Katharine A., Douglas E. Schoenherr, and Carole Silver, editors, The Earthly Paradise: Arts and Crafts by William Morris and his Circle in Canadian Collections, Key Porter Books, 1993, 
 Parry, Linda, ed., William Morris, Abrams, 1996, 
 Roberts, Helene E.: Art History Through the Camera's Lens, Routledge, 1995,  (excerpt at )
 Wildman, Stephen: Edward Burne-Jones: Victorian Artist-Dreamer, Metropolitan Museum of Art, 1998,

External links

 Frederick Hollyer Collection at the Victoria & Albert Museum
 Works by Frederick Hollyer in Birmingham Museums & Art Gallery's collection  The Pre-Raphaelite Online Resource
 Pictures by Frederick Hollyer at the National Portrait Gallery
 Pictures by Frederick Hollyer at the Hollyer Family site

1838 births
1933 deaths
British portrait photographers
19th-century English photographers
People from Pentonville
Photographers from London